Sanga-Sanga is an island in the southwestern Philippines, part of the Sulu Archipelago between the Sulu Sea and Celebes Sea. It is sandwiched between Tawitawi Island to the east and Bangao Island to the south.

The island is subdivided into 11 barangays (Karungdong, Lakit-Lakit, Lato-Lato, Luuk Pandan, Malassa, Mandulan, Pagasinan, Pakias, Paniongan, Sanga-Sanga, and Tubig Basag), all belonging to the municipality of Bongao in the province of Tawi-Tawi.

History 

During World War II the island was a major stopover for the Japanese Navy. It was liberated by American forces on 2 April 1945, and used by American and Australian forces.

Transportation 

Sanga-Sanga Airport, the main airport serving Tawi-Tawi province, is located on the island.

References

External links
 Sanga-Sanga Island at OpenStreetMap

Islands of Tawi-Tawi
Barangays of Tawi-Tawi